Thomas Harrison Ridley (died March 22, 1904) was a merchant and political figure in Colony of Newfoundland. He represented Trinity Bay in the Newfoundland and Labrador House of Assembly from 1869 to 1871 as a Confederate.

He was born in Harbour Grace, the son of Thomas Ridley. Ridley entered his father's fishery supply business. He served as a member of the Legislative Council from 1855 to 1869. In 1871, Ridley resigned his seat in the assembly and moved to England. By this time, the family business was failing: it was declared insolvent in 1873. Ridley died in London.

References 
 

Members of the Newfoundland and Labrador House of Assembly
Year of birth missing
1904 deaths
Members of the Legislative Council of Newfoundland
Newfoundland Colony people